Kenneth Ma Kwok-ming (born 13 February 1974) is a Hong Kong actor contracted to TVB.

Ma had won the Most Popular Male Character award at the TVB Anniversary Awards for four times in 2012, 2017, 2018 and 2021 respectively, becoming the TVB actor with the most wins in that category. In 2019, he won the TVB Anniversary Award for Best Actor with his role in the drama Big White Duel.

Early life
As the youngest of a family of three children, Kenneth Ma has two older twin sisters. He attended Salesian English School before immigrating with his family to Vancouver, British Columbia, Canada in 1992. His father, who worked as a mechanical engineer, would travel back and forth between Hong Kong and Vancouver for work. At first his family lived in Richmond before settling in Port Coquitlam. After attending one semester at Douglas College, he transferred to University of British Columbia majoring in mechanical engineering. During college, Ma joined an acting troupe that would perform sketches. After graduating from college in 1998, Ma and his entire family decided to return to Hong Kong.

When Ma returned to Hong Kong, he initially worked at a glass manufacturing company as a quality surveillance inspector but found his job boring. Hoping to find something more of his interest, he sent out over 70 resumes but only received a response from TVB for an interview notice to their 14th Artist Training Class. His starting salary at TVB was a meager estimated HK$4000.00 a month, one third of his former job salary, but since he found acting to be more suitable for him, he decided to join TVB.

Career

In the beginning of Ma’s career at TVB, he often played extras, passers-by and fill ins. One of Ma's early roles was playing the giant cockroach “Siu Keung” in Dayo Wong's music video "Blue Sky". Within 5 years since graduating from TVB's training course, the company started to promote him when he was chosen as one of the S4's in 2003 drama Triumph in the Skies and later as one of the six "siu sangs" to be the "Olympic 6" (the other five being Sammul Chan, Ron Ng, Bosco Wong, Raymond Lam and Lai Lok-yi) during the 2004 Athens Olympic Games.

In 2006, Ma won the Most Improved Male Artiste award at the TVB Anniversary Awards. In late 2007, he played his first leading role in the drama Survivor's Law II.

In 2012, Ma gained recognition with his role as Cheung Yat-kin in the critical acclaimed medical drama The Hippocratic Crush, winning awards from both Malaysia (Favourite TVB Actor) and Hong Kong (My Favourite Male Character).

After starring in the hit 2013 drama Triumph in the Skies II, Ma caught the eye of international star Jackie Chan and was invited to star in the romantic comedy Fate Is a Game.

In 2017, Ma starred in the critically acclaimed supernatural drama The Exorcist's Meter as the taxi driver and exorcist Ma Kwai (Siu Ma). Acknowledging his strong performance in that series, Ma was labelled as "citizen's best actor pick" and became a strong contender for the Best Actor award at the 2017 TVB Anniversary Awards. He eventually won the Most Popular Male Character award, which was his second win in that category. In addition, Ma won the Best Actor in a Leading Role awards in both the People's Choice TV Awards 2017 and the Hong Kong Television Awards 2017, which served as a public recognition, as all awardees were 100% voted for by audience and netizens.

In 2018, Ma won the Most Popular Male Character award for the third time at the TVB Anniversary Awards with his role in the period drama Deep in the Realm of Conscience.

In 2019, Ma starred in critical acclaimed medical drama Big White Duel, eventually winning the Best Actor award at the TVB Anniversary Awards.

With his role in 2021 medical drama Kids’ Lives Matter, Ma won the Most Popular Male Character award at the TVB Anniversary Awards, which is his fourth win in that category.

Personal life
Kenneth Ma lives with his parents in a 900 square feet flat located in Tai Koo City, Hong Kong. He has said that his future wife must get along with his parents and be able to live together with them.

During his youth, Ma and his mother were fans of Leslie Cheung. Ma's mother adopted her western name after Cheung's hit song "Monica". At age 14, Ma was featured in Cheung's 1988 Pepsi commercial.

Ma is known to commute to work via mass transit even though he owns a car. He is a soccer fan and supporter of Real Madrid, Manchester United, and AC Milan.

Ma met Jacqueline Wong in 2015 during the filming of Inspector Gourmet. The two announced their relationship in 2017, but broke up after Wong was spotted kissing married star Andy Hui in April 2019.

On 12 June 2020, Ma and Roxanne Tong were found to be dating in Hung Hom. They admitted their relationship on the next day via Instagram. They became engaged in 2023.

Filmography

Television dramas

Films

Awards and nominations

TVB Anniversary Awards 
Ma has won seven TVB Anniversary Awards between 2005 and 2021.

TVB Star Awards Malaysia 
Ma has won eight awards at the TVB Star Awards Malaysia (known as the My Astro On Demand Favourites Awards for a time) between 2010 and 2014.

StarHub TVB Awards 
Ma has won seven awards between 2012 and 2017 at the Starhub TVB Awards.

Next TV Awards

Yahoo Asia Buzz Awards

People's Choice Television Awards

Other awards

References

External links
 
 
 

1974 births
Living people
20th-century Canadian male actors
20th-century Hong Kong male actors
21st-century Canadian male actors
21st-century Hong Kong male actors
Male actors from Vancouver
Canadian male actors of Hong Kong descent
Hong Kong emigrants to Canada
Hong Kong male film actors
Naturalized citizens of Canada
People from Port Coquitlam
People from Richmond, British Columbia
TVB veteran actors
University of British Columbia alumni